The Berwick Prize and Senior Berwick Prize are two prizes of the London Mathematical Society awarded in alternating years in memory of William Edward Hodgson Berwick, a previous Vice-President of the LMS. Berwick left some money to be given to the society to establish two prizes. His widow Daisy May Berwick gave the society the money and the society established the prizes, with the first Senior Berwick Prize being presented in 1946 and the first Junior Berwick Prize the following year. The prizes are awarded "in recognition of an outstanding piece of mathematical research ... published by the Society" in the eight years before the year of the award.

The Berwick Prize was known as the Junior Berwick Prize up to 1999, and was given its current name for the 2001 award.

Senior Berwick Prize winners

Source:

Berwick Prize winners
Source:

See also
 Whitehead Prize
 Senior Whitehead Prize
 Shephard Prize
 Fröhlich Prize
 Naylor Prize and Lectureship
 Pólya Prize (LMS)
 De Morgan Medal
 List of mathematics awards.

References

British science and technology awards
Awards established in 1946
1946 establishments in England
Awards of the London Mathematical Society